is a 2022 Japanese animated fantasy adventure film produced by CoMix Wave Films. It depicts a high school girl and a mysterious young man trying to prevent a series of disasters across Japan. The film was commissioned in 2020, written and directed by Makoto Shinkai.

The film features the voices of Nanoka Hara and Hokuto Matsumura, with the character designs by Masayoshi Tanaka, animation direction by Kenichi Tsuchiya, art direction by Takumi Tanji, and music by Radwimps and Kazuma Jinnouchi. 

Suzume had an advance IMAX screening in Japan on November 7, 2022, and was released nationwide on November 11, by Toho. The film has grossed million worldwide, becoming the fourth-highest-grossing film of 2022 in Japan.

Plot
Suzume Iwato is a 17-year-old high-school girl who lives with her aunt Tamaki in a small town in Miyazaki, Kyushu. One night, she dreams of being her younger self, searching for her mother in a ruined neighborhood. The next morning, on her way to school, Suzume encounters a young man searching for abandoned areas with doors. She tells him about an old onsen resort nearby. Driven by curiosity, Suzume follows the man to the abandoned resort, where she finds a door standing alone on its frame. She opens the door and sees a starlit field which she cannot enter (she passes through the door as normal). She then trips over a cat statue which becomes a real white cat and flees. Frightened, she leaves and heads to school.

Later at lunchtime, a small earthquake occurs. Suzume notices a blaze-like column arising from the site of the onsen that nobody else can see. Returning there, she finds the man from before, trying to close the door. Seeing him struggle and get injured, Suzume rushes to help, allowing the man to lock the door with an old key. The red column disappears, but not before crashing invisibly into the town and causing earthquake-like damage. 

Suzume takes the man, Sōta Munakata, to her home to bandage his wound. He explains that he travels across Japan, finding and locking doors in abandoned places to prevent a giant supernatural "worm" from causing earthquakes on the islands. The cat from the resort appears and turns Sōta into the child's chair he was sitting on. Sōta, now an animated chair with a missing leg, chases the cat to a ferry headed for Ehime with Suzume in tow. He describes the cat as a keystone, and that the worm was released after its removal from near the abandoned door.

At Ehime, the pair use clues on social media from locals who have photographed the cat and named it "Daijin" to follow it across Shikoku, just as another earthquake occurs. With the help of local resident Chika, they find the worm and try to close its door of entry at an abandoned school. Sōta drops his key, so he tells Suzume to use it and lock the door by imagining the school's heyday. They successfully close the door, exorcising the worm.

Following Daijin's trail to Kobe thanks to Rumi, a local bar owner and single mother, the duo encounter the worm reemerging at an abandoned amusement park. Sōta demands that Daijin turn back into a keystone, but he refuses, wanting to "play" with Suzume. Although Suzume is briefly entranced by the view of the starlit field through the door, she and Sōta lock it. Sōta explains that the field is the afterlife where souls go after death. As they spend the night at Rumi's bar, it is revealed that Sōta is losing his sense of self in his chair form.

After tracking Daijin all the way to Tokyo, Sōta has Suzume take him to his apartment. He tells her the myth of the worm, actually a creature called Namazu, and how it is pacified by the placement of two keystones placed at eastern and western Japan. The western keystone has become the cat Daijin, while records of the eastern keystone's last location are obscure. If the worm should appear in Tokyo and is not stopped, it could destroy the city similar to the 1923 Great Kantō earthquake. Sōta's family makes sure the doors where the worm could emerge (in abandoned areas) remain locked, and that he took on the burden from his hospitalized grandfather. 

Daijin reappears and says that he passed on his function as a keystone to Sōta's chair form, making him the new means to stop the worm. After finding the reemerged worm, Sōta turns into a keystone in Suzume's hands. Knowing that the earthquake caused by the fully-emerged worm would kill many people, Suzume tearfully seals it with the new keystone. She wakes up in a cave, where she finds Tokyo's doorway. Peering into the afterlife, she sees the keystone Sōta but again cannot reach him. Suzume visits Sōta's grandfather at the hospital. He explains that Suzume's ability to see the worm and the afterlife through the doors means that she had accidentally entered the realm once before. Moreover, that doorway she entered from is the only place where she could reenter the afterlife and save Sōta.

Upon reuniting with her Aunt Tamaki, who had followed her from Miyazaki, Suzume asks Sōta's university friend Serizawa to take them to her hometown in Tōhoku, which was destroyed in the 2011 Tōhoku earthquake and tsunami. At a rest stop along the way, Suzume and Tamaki get into an argument, leading Suzume to realize that Tamaki is being possessed by Sadaijin, the eastern keystone which has transformed into a black cat. Upon being released from possession, Tamaki and Suzune reconcile. When Serizawa's car falls off the road, Tamaki takes Suzume the rest of the way by bicycle to the ruins of her old house where she once lived with her mother, Tamaki's sister, a single parent and nurse who was killed in the tsunami. Suzume finds the old door she once used, and enters through.

She emerges in the afterlife which appears as her town following the earthquake and tsunami, with Sōta in stasis from a distance. While Sadaijin distracts the worm from reentering the living world, Suzume pulls Sōta out of stasis, returning him to human form. Admitting defeat, Daijin returns to being a keystone. In order to seal the worm once more, Sōta offers a prayer, bringing back echoes of Suzume's hometown. Suzume, carrying Daijin/western keystone, and Sōta, with Sadaijin/eastern keystone, reseal the worm and prevent it from leaving the afterlife.  

Sōta then notices a child in the afterlife: Suzume from 12 years ago. Suzume remembers the first time she entered the afterlife by accident as a child, following the earthquake-tsunami disaster and her mother's death. Young Suzume had mistaken her older self for her mother when she approached. Suzume takes her old chair, built by her mother, from the afterlife version of her ruined home and gives it to her younger self, telling her about her future. Young Suzume exits the afterlife with the chair, leading to her being found by Tamaki 12 years prior. Suzume and Sōta then leave the afterlife themselves, returning to present-day Tōhoku. Sōta returns to Tokyo while Suzume and Tamaki return to Kyushu, revisiting the friends she made along the way.

Sometime later, back in Miyazaki, Suzume is on her way to school when she once again runs into Sōta, walking up the same road where they first met.

Voice cast
 Nanoka Hara as 
 Akari Miura as child Suzume
 Hokuto Matsumura as 
 Eri Fukatsu as 
 Shota Sometani as 
 Sairi Ito as 
 Kotone Hanase as 
 Kana Hanazawa as 
 Matsumoto Hakuō II as 
 Ryūnosuke Kamiki as 
 Ann Yamane as 
 Aimi as

Production

Development

Makoto Shinkai conceived the idea for Suzume while he was traveling around Japan to give talks about his past works. Shinkai noticed that there were more empty or abandoned areas in Japan due to the country's declining birth rate and aging population, so he thought of writing a story about "mourning deserted places." As a result, the film inevitably turned into a road movie about visiting places. 

The 2011 Tōhoku earthquake and tsunami served as an influence for the themes in the film. While the Tiamat comet in Your Name and the concept of Weathering with You were ideas influenced by the natural disaster, Shinkai felt that he should "express the impact [he] felt through the earthquake and tsunami, instead of continuing to depict it as a metaphor." He feared that people's memories of the disaster start to become "hazy" over time, and by depicting the earthquake and tsunami in his film or novel, he could also share his memories with teens who were unaware of the disaster. Shinkai also cited Kiki's Delivery Service, Guardian: The Lonely and Great God, and Haruki Murakami's novel Kafka on the Shore and short story  as influences for the film.

Shinkai and his staff planned the project from January to March 2020. They started developing the film's script in April, which is when the Japanese government declared a state of emergency due to the COVID-19 pandemic. In an interview with TV Asahi, Shinkai mentioned that the pandemic had a less tangible effect on the film's production. However, he said that "the mood of the times is indelibly etched into the script", adding that the film will have a post-apocalyptic theme. Sōta turning into a chair was in reference to Shinkai feeling trapped during the COVID-19 curbs. After finishing the script in August, the storyboards were drafted from September 2020 to December 2021, while the production of the animation started in April 2021. The film was officially unveiled during a press conference on December 15, 2021. The film's staff includes Masayoshi Tanaka as the character designer, Kenichi Tsuchiya as the animation director, and Takumi Tanji as the art director. CoMix Wave Films and Story Inc. were revealed as the film's producers. In October 2022, Shinkai announced that production on the film was completed.

Characters
Shinkai immediately decided for the film to have a female main character, since Weathering with You had a male main character, and also felt that a "buddy" character was necessary. He believed the film's tension would "inevitably become quieter" if the story focused on mourning a place, so he decided for the film to be a "buddy story" between a girl and a chair to keep it entertaining. Shinkai initially thought of other options for potential partners, such as another girl, one that turns into a monster throughout the story, and "inorganic partners" like a milk carton. The idea for a chair partner came when Shinkai saw a wooden chair sitting at a deserted bus stop, and found its "foreign feeling" to be better than any of his previous ideas. Shinkai also became less interested in writing a love story and wanted to depict different relationships, like with Suzume and her aunt.

Casting
Nanoka Hara was revealed as the voice of Suzume Iwato on July 5, 2022. Shinkai selected her from an audition involving more than 1,700 people. Hara has been a fan of Shinkai's works, remarking that she could not imagine being the one to share the "unforgettable, heart-shaking sensation" she felt when first seeing one of his films in theaters. On September 6, 2022, Hokuto Matsumura's role as Sōta Munakata was revealed. He described the character as one that "[he] had never seen in any of the director's works". Therefore, Matsumura gave a voice for Sōta that he "had never heard before," which involved using a slightly lower tone. Shinkai found his voice to be "impressive" and said that it "embodies the character". Suzume and Sōta are Hara and Matsumura's first anime voice-acting roles. On September 29, Eri Fukatsu, Shota Sometani, Sairi Ito, Kotone Hanase, Kana Hanazawa, and Matsumoto Hakuō II were revealed to be joining the voice cast. On October 25, Ryūnosuke Kamiki, who voiced Taki Tachibana in Your Name, was added to the cast for the role of Tomoya Serizawa.

Music

On September 20, 2022, it was announced that the band Radwimps, which had previously collaborated with Shinkai on Your Name and Weathering with You, would be composing the score for the film, along with composer Kazuma Jinnouchi. It was also revealed that TikTok singer Toaka provided the vocals for the first theme song, which debuted on music streaming services on September 30, 2022. The second theme song, debuted online on October 28, 2022. The soundtrack was released on November 11, 2022, the day of the film's release. Some of its recordings were done at Abbey Road Studios in London.

Marketing
A teaser poster was released alongside the film's announcement. On April 9, 2022, an updated version featuring the film's protagonist was released online and as a full-page advertisement in the morning edition of The Asahi Shimbun newspaper. It was also announced that the film would be released on November 11. Toho debuted a teaser trailer on April 10, 2022, and a full trailer was released on July 15. The main poster, along with the second trailer, was released on September 29, 2022. Nippon TV previewed the first 12 minutes of the film on October 28, 2022, during a broadcast of Your Name on NNN's  program. Prior to the film's release, the production committee warned filmgoers of scenes in the film that depict an earthquake and sounds of earthquake alarms, and reassured that the sounds were fictional.

Several bonus items were given to filmgoers in Japan. A booklet, titled , was the first to be distributed, and had a print run of 3 million copies. The booklet contained the original proposals for Suzume, Your Name, and Weathering with You, and interviews with Shinkai, Hara, and Matsumura. A second booklet, was distributed beginning on December 3, with a print run of 1.5 million copies. A spin-off novel written by Shinkai, subtitled , was given starting on December 24. A second novel, was distributed starting on January 28, 2023. McDonald's Japan released a Happy Meal set that includes a spin-off picture book, titled , which tells an original story written by Shinkai and illustrated by Senbon Umishima. Other partners for the film include , Lawson, and KDDI's au. Additionally, a promotional campaign was held involving one local company from each of the 47 prefectures of Japan. The film also had a 20-page special feature in the #50/2022 issue of Kodansha's Weekly Shōnen Magazine.

Release
Suzume had an advance IMAX screening on November 7, 2022, for watchers who were decided through a lottery. It was released nationwide by Toho in 420 theaters in Japan on November 11 through regular and IMAX screenings. Midnight screenings were held in 11 theaters across six cities in Japan. The film premiered internationally in competition at the 73rd Berlin International Film Festival on February 23, 2023, marking the first time an anime film competed in the festival since Spirited Away in 2002.

In Asia, the film began screening on March 2, 2023, in Taiwan and Hong Kong; March 8 in Indonesia, Philippines (released through Warner Bros. Pictures), and South Korea; March 9 in Malaysia and Singapore; March 10 in Vietnam; March 24 in China; and April 21 in India.

In May 2022, it was announced that Crunchyroll, Sony Pictures, and Wild Bunch International have acquired the film's global distribution rights. Crunchyroll will handle distribution in North America and will partner with Sony in territories outside of Asia, while Sony and Wild Bunch will co-distribute in Europe. A special screening for the film was held on March 1, 2023, at the BFI Southbank in London, with Shinkai himself attending the event. The film had its North American premiere at the New York International Children's Film Festival on March 5. Suzume will begin its general screening on April 12, 2023, in France and Malta; April 13 in Australia, Brazil, Germany, Mexico, and New Zealand; and April 14 in Austria, Belgium, Canada, Gibraltar, Ireland, Luxembourg, the United Kingdom and the United States.

Reception

Box office
Suzume grossed billion (million) in Japan, with a worldwide total of million. The film debuted at number one at the Japanese box office, and grossed billion (million) from the advance IMAX screening and during its first three days. It surpassed Weathering with You to become the biggest three-day opening for a Shinkai film. In Japan, it is the fourth-highest-grossing film of 2022, the ninth-highest-grossing anime film of all time, and the 15th-overall highest-grossing film of all time.

Critical response
The Japanese review aggregator Filmarks reported that Suzume received an average rating of 4.00/5 based on 6,585 reviews, placing second in its first-day satisfaction ranking. On review aggregator website Rotten Tomatoes, the film has an approval rating of 93% based on 15 reviews, with an average rating of 7.9/10. On Metacritic, the film has a weighted average of 78 out of 100 based on 6 critic reviews, indicating "generally favorable reviews".

Matt Schley of The Japan Times gave the film 4 out of 5 stars, and called it "the director’s most satisfying work yet." He praised the art and animation, and while he also described some of the dialogue as "cliche or cringe-worthy", he also felt that the film was "a bit more mature" than Shinkai's past films. Schley also found the film's climax "somewhat disturbing", and said that it might divide viewers on whether Shinkai "earns" it. Richard Eisenbeis, writing for Anime News Network, graded the film 'A', praising the story, characters, animation, and music, but found the plot structure to be similar to Your Name and Weathering with You, making the film "more predictable." Einsenbeis also criticized the appearance of a creature that Suzume encountered in Tokyo, describing it as "a cheap CG effect placed over the otherwise quality animation and blended poorly."

Accolades

Adaptations
A novel adaptation written by Shinkai was released on August 24, 2022, under the Kadokawa Bunko imprint. A portion of the novel was included in a booklet distributed during the 2022 Kadobun Summer Fair, which was held in Japanese bookstores on June 10. A children's paperback edition, which adds furigana and illustrations drawn by Chiko, was released on October 13 under the Kadokawa Tsubasa Bunko imprint. The novel has sold over 350,000 copies as of November 2022; it is the best-selling physical light novel volume of that year in Japan. In January 2023, Yen Press announced that it licensed the series for English publication in digital and print formats.

A manga adaptation illustrated by Denki Amashima began serialization in Kodansha's Monthly Afternoon magazine on October 25, 2022.

References

External links
  
 
 

2022 anime films
2022 fantasy films
2020s teen films
2020s teen fantasy films
Animated films set in Tokyo
Anime with original screenplays
Crunchyroll anime
CoMix Wave Films films
Films about earthquakes
Films about the 2011 Tōhoku earthquake and tsunami
Films set in Ehime Prefecture
Films set in Iwate Prefecture
Films set in Kobe
Films set in Miyagi Prefecture
Films set in Miyazaki Prefecture
Films set in Tokyo
Films set in 2023
Films directed by Makoto Shinkai
Films with screenplays by Makoto Shinkai
IMAX films
Japanese animated fantasy films
Japanese animated feature films
Japanese fantasy adventure films
Japanese teen films
Japanese road movies
Toho animated films
Yen Press titles